Dennis O'Keefe (born Edward Vanes Flanagan, Jr., March 29, 1908 – August 31, 1968) was an American actor and screenwriter.

Early years
Born in Fort Madison, Iowa, O'Keefe was the son of Edward Flanagan and Charlotte Flanagan, Irish vaudevillians working in the United States. As a small child, he joined his parents' act and later wrote skits for the stage. He attended the University of Southern California but left midway through his sophomore year after his father died.

Career 
O'Keefe continued his father's vaudeville act for several years after the father's death. He started in films as an extra in 1931 and appeared in numerous films under the name Bud Flanagan.  After a small but impressive role in Saratoga (1937), Clark Gable recommended O'Keefe to Metro-Goldwyn-Mayer, which signed him to a contract in 1937 and renamed him Dennis O'Keefe. His film roles were bigger after that, starting with The Bad Man of Brimstone (1938) opposite Wallace Beery, and the lead role in Burn 'Em Up O'Connor (1939).

O'Keefe left MGM around 1940 but continued to work in mostly lower budget productions. He often played the tough guy in action and crime dramas, but was also known as a comic actor as well as a dramatic lead.

He gained great attention with a showy role in The Story of Dr Wassell and became a comedy star. He expressed interest in expanding into direction.

In the mid-1940s, he was under a five-year contract to Edward Small. O'Keefe starred in film-noir classics such as T-Men and Raw Deal, both directed by Anthony Mann.

In a 1946 newsreel following Howard Hughes' calamitous plane wreck into a neighbor's Beverly Hills house, O'Keefe can be seen walking through the home inspecting the damage.

In 1950, O'Keefe starred in the radio program T-Man on CBS. Also in the 1950s, he did some directing and wrote mystery stories. During the 1950s, O'Keefe made guest appearances as himself, or in acting roles, on a episodes of a number of television series, such as the legal drama Justice, the variety show The Ford Show, Studio 57, the anthology series Climax! and others. In 1957 he was to be the permanent host of Suspicion, an anthology TV series in which ten episodes were produced by Alfred Hitchcock. After two episodes he left the series and was not replaced. From 1959-1960, he was the star of the CBS Television situation comedy, The Dennis O'Keefe Show.

O'Keefe's Broadway credits include Never Live Over a Pretzel Factory (1964) and Never Too Late.

O'Keefe wrote under the pen name Jonathan Ricks. His Don't Pull Your Punches was produced by Warner Bros. In 1947, he was working on plans to co-produce and act in Drawn Sabers, another of his stories. He also wrote and directed Angela.

Personal life
O'Keefe had a brief marriage to Louise Stanley, an actress; they married in 1937 and divorced in 1938.

O'Keefe was married in 1940 to Steffi Duna, an actress and dancer. They had two children, Juliena and James.

O'Keefe was a Roman Catholic. He was also a registered Democrat who supported the campaign of Adlai Stevenson during the 1952 presidential election.

Death

A heavy cigarette smoker, O'Keefe died of lung cancer in 1968 at the age of 60 at St. John's Hospital in Santa Monica, California and was buried at Wee Kirk O' the Heather, Forest Lawn Memorial Park (Glendale).

Selected filmography

Hold That Kiss (1938) as Tommy Bradford
The Chaser (1938) as Thomas Z. 'Tom' Brandon
Vacation from Love (1938) as W.D. 'Bill' Blair
Burn 'Em Up O'Connor (1939) as Jerry O'Connor
The Kid From Texas (1939) as William Quincy
Unexpected Father (1939) as Jimmy Hanley
That's Right—You're Wrong (1939) as Chuck Deems - the Band Manager
Alias the Deacon (1940) as Johnny Sloan
La Conga Nights (1940) as Steve Collins
Pop Always Pays (1940) as Jeff Thompson
Girl from Havana (1940) as Woody Davis
Arise, My Love (1940) as Shep
I'm Nobody's Sweetheart Now (1940) as Tod Lowell
You'll Find Out (1940) as Chuck Deems
Bowery Boy (1940) as Dr. Tom O'Hara
Topper Returns (1941) as Bob
Mr. District Attorney (1941) as P. Cadwallader Jones
Broadway Limited (1941) as Dr. Harvey North
Lady Scarface (1941) as Lt. Bill Mason
Weekend for Three (1941) as Jim Craig
The Affairs of Jimmy Valentine (1942) as Mike Jason
Moonlight Masquerade (1942) as John Bennett Jr.
Hangmen Also Die! (1943) as Jan Horak
Tahiti Honey (1943) as Mickey Monroe
Good Morning, Judge (1943) as David Barton
The Leopard Man (1943) as Jerry Manning
Hi Diddle Diddle (1943) as Sonny Phyffe
The Fighting Seabees (1944) as Lt. Cmdr. Robert Yarrow
Up in Mabel's Room (1944) as Gary Ainsworth
The Story of Dr. Wassell (1944) as Benjamin 'Hoppy' Hopkins
Sensations of 1945 (1944) as Junior Crane
Abroad with Two Yanks (1944) as Jeff Reardon
The Affairs of Susan (1945) as Bill Anthony
Earl Carroll Vanities (1945) as Danny Baldwin
Brewster's Millions (1945) as Montague L. 'Monty' Brewster
Getting Gertie's Garter (1945) as Dr. Kenneth B. Ford
Doll Face (1945) as Michael Francis 'Mike' Hannegan
Her Adventurous Night (1946) as Bill Fry
Mr. District Attorney (1947) as Steve Bennett
Dishonored Lady (1947) as Dr. David S. Cousins
T-Men (1947) as Dennis O'Brien - aka Vannie Harrigan
Raw Deal (1948) as Joe Sullivan
Walk a Crooked Mile (1948) as Daniel F. O'Hara
Siren of Atlantis (1949) as Capt. Jean Morhange
Cover Up (1949) as Sam Donovan
The Great Dan Patch (1949) as David Palmer
Abandoned (1949) as Mark Sitko
The Eagle and the Hawk (1950) as Whitney Randolph
Woman on the Run (1950) as Dan Legget
The Company She Keeps (1951) as Larry Collins
Follow the Sun (1951) as Chuck Williams
Passage West (1951) as Jacob Karns
One Big Affair (1952) as Jimmy Donovan
Everything I Have Is Yours (1952) as Alec Tacksbury
The Lady Wants Mink (1953) as Jim Connors
The Fake (1953) as Paul Mitchell
Drums of Tahiti (1954) as Mike Macklin
The Diamond (1954, aka The Diamond Wizard) as Joe Dennison
Angela (1954) as Steve Catlett
Las Vegas Shakedown (1955) as Joe Barnes
Chicago Syndicate (1955) as Barry Amsterdam
Inside Detroit (1956) as Blair Vickers
Dragoon Wells Massacre (1957) as Capt. Matt Riordan
Lady of Vengeance (1957) as William T. Marshall
All Hands on Deck (1961) as Lt. Cmdr. Brian

References

External links
 
 

1908 births
1968 deaths
Male actors from Iowa
Deaths from lung cancer in California
American people of Irish descent
Vaudeville performers
20th-century American male actors
American male film actors
American male stage actors
American male television actors
Burials at Forest Lawn Memorial Park (Glendale)
American Roman Catholics
California Democrats
Iowa Democrats